The William Wallace Statue near the grounds of the Bemersyde estate, near Melrose in the Scottish Borders is a statue commemorating William Wallace. It was commissioned by David Steuart Erskine, 11th Earl of Buchan, and it protected as a category B listed building.

The statue was made of red sandstone by John Smith of Darnick and was erected in 1814. In 1991, the William Wallace Trust ,which owns the statue and surrounding land and car park raised funds for a renovation which was carried out by Bob Heath and Graciella Glenn Ainsworth.

At Wallace's feet reads the inscription: 

Below the statue of Wallace, as part of the same construction by John Smith is a smaller statue of a funeral style urn inscribed as follows: 

Close by are Brotherstone Hill, Dryburgh Abbey, the Leaderfoot Viaduct, Newtown St. Boswells, Scott's View, and the Smailholm Tower.

See also
Wallace Monument
William Wallace Statue, Aberdeen
List of places in the Scottish Borders
List of places in Scotland

References

External links
Longshanks vs Wallace – Borderlands, Discover Scottish Borders 

Buildings and structures in the Scottish Borders
Monuments and memorials in Scotland
William Wallace
Outdoor sculptures in Scotland
Category B listed buildings in the Scottish Borders
Stone sculptures in the United Kingdom
1814 sculptures
Statues in Scotland
Sandstone sculptures
1814 establishments in Scotland